Koyadaira Dam is a gravity dam located in Toyama prefecture in Japan. The dam is used for power production. The catchment area of the dam is 404.8 km2. The dam impounds about 10  ha of land when full and can store 2122 thousand cubic meters of water. The construction of the dam was started on 1933 and completed in 1936.

References

Dams in Toyama Prefecture
1936 establishments in Japan